A-Town Hard Heads is the debut album by the Hard Boys. It was released on March 5, 1992, through Ichiban Records and was produced by Joel Peasvy. The album peaked at number 42 on the Billboard Top R&B/Hip-Hop Albums chart. "Groupies" and "Death Row" were released as singles.

Track listing
"Prelude"- 1:40  
"Street Mutha Fuckas"- 4:32  
"E Z Pimpin"- 4:50  
"Jock Itch"- 3:39  
"Fletch"- :52  
"3 Counts"- 4:04  
"A-Town Hard Heads"- 5:56  
"Strong in the Game"- 4:49  
"Criminal Behavior"- 5:04  
"Groupies"- 3:28  
"Mission to Nowhere"- 4:51  
"Armed Robbery"- 3:52  
"Players"- 4:24  
"At 2 O'Clock"- 1:43  
"Death Row"- 5:09

Charts

External links
[ A-Town Hard Heads] at Allmusic
A-Town Hard Heads at Discogs
A-Town Hard Heads at Tower Records
[ A-Town Hard Heads] at Billboard

1992 debut albums
Hard Boyz albums
Ichiban Records albums